Ağdabançay is one of the tributaries of the Tartarchay located in Karabakh region of Republic of Azerbaijan.

Overview

See also
Rivers and lakes in Azerbaijan
Tartarchay
Levçay
Turağayçay
Qarqar River

References

Kalbajar District
Rivers of Azerbaijan
Tartar District